Derbyshire F.C., often referred to as Derby F.C., was an English association football club, based at the Derbyshire County Cricket Ground in Derby, England.

History
The Derbyshire club was founded in 1871 and was originally the representative side of the Derbyshire Football Association, representing a dozen Derbyshire sides and playing under Sheffield rules as well as Association laws.  Until 1878 the Derbyshire club was still claiming to have an available membership of 200, but as more sides arose in the county, and the Sheffield rules merged with Association rules, there was less need for a representative side; indeed the Derbyshire side failed to turn up for a fixture with the Sheffield FA in February 1878.  By the 1878-79 season the club only had 30 members, suggesting it had become a "regular" club, using the Derbyshire name.

The club first entered the FA Cup after this transition, in 1880-81, playing Notts County at Trent Bridge in the first round.  At half-time Derby were 4-1 up, and although Notts scored twice in the second half, it appeared Derby had won through to the second round.  However, with the score at 4-2, Notts claimed to have scored a goal, which the umpire disallowed as having previously allowed a Derby appeal that the ball had gone out of play.  As the referee's decision was not final at the time, Notts appealed to the FA that the goal was a good one, and the Football Association allowed the appeal, thus ordering a replay.  Notts won the replay 4-2, after 15 minutes of extra time, and Derby appealed the result on the basis that Derby had a goal disallowed during normal time that would have won them the match; this time the FA turned down the appeal.

Derby Town

Most of the Derbyshire players from 1880-81, including club secretary W. Shaw, played for a club named Derby Town the next season; it is unclear whether this is the same club as Derbyshire under a new name, or a new club, as the "Derby" name is still recorded in the Alcock yearbook as the same club as in 1880-81.  Derby Town's one FA Cup appearance was a 4-1 defeat to Small Heath Alliance in the first round in 1881-82.  By 1884, the county cricket club had formed a new football team, and Derby Town was absorbed into the new club as a reserve outfit.

Colours

The club wore white until 1875-76, then scarlet and white (probably in hoops) until 1878-79.  For its FA Cup appearances the club wore black shirts.

Grounds

The club played at the Derbyshire cricket ground, then known as the South Derbyshire ground.

References

Defunct football clubs in England
Association football clubs established in the 19th century